Siba Shakib is an Iranian/German filmmaker, writer and political activist. She was born and raised in Tehran, Iran. Her international bestseller Afghanistan, Where God Only Comes to Weep has been translated into 27 languages and won a P.E.N. prize

Career

Before writing her first novel, Shakib was a music journalist and a radio presenter. She also interviewed many musicians for television, including Miles Davis, Mick Jagger and Tina Turner. She often offered her own political observation and commentary during these interviews which led to her current political television shows for a young audience.

Later when she moved on to do films and documentaries her work reflected the social and economical situation of needy people around the world.

Since the early 1990s, Shakib has mostly worked in two countries: Iran, where she was born and raised, and neighbouring Afghanistan. Her film A Flower for the Women of Kabul received a German Human Rights film prize on 50th anniversary of the UN Human Rights declaration.

Shakib used some of the royalties from her films and books to help build a woman’s centre in Kabul.

She was finalizing her first book Afghanistan, Where God Only Comes to Weep in her home in New York when terrorists attacked the World Trade Center. For a week Shakib supported the staff of the ARD, German Television in New York by reporting about the attacks.

She received the renown Peter Surava PEN prize for her first novel.

At the beginning of 2002, the German ministry of Defence benefited from Shakib's insight and knowledge about Afghanistan and searched her input and collaboration as an advisor for their peace troops, ISAF in Afghanistan. Later her activity was extended to supporting and advising the NATO troops in theatre.

Afghanistan, Where God Only Comes to Weep has been translated into 27 languages and Shakib has received numerous recognitions and prizes for it. Art works, aid organisations, water-wells and kindergartens have been named after Shirin-Gol and other heroes of her books.

Future projects

Siba Shakib is currently working on several new book projects, historic novels on Iran, Afghanistan, Oman, Zanzibar   and the story of a young Iranian boy, who is losing himself only to create a new identity as an attractive and cherished woman. 
http://www.randomhouse.de/book/edition.jsp?edi=215280

She is also working on the adaptation of her second international bestseller Samira and Samir into a feature film. She has received grants and support from the German Filmstiftung NRW and MEDIA toward this end. Shakib has written the script and she will also direct the movie herself. Currently the Casting is in process, however award-winning and well known Iranian actress, Golshifteh Farahani (Body of Lies, with Leonardo DiCaprio) has accepted to play the main role of SAMIRA.

Currently she lives in New York City, Italy and Dubai.

Works

Books
Samira and Samir (2005), Arrow Books Ltd, 
Afghanistan, Where God Only Comes to Weep (2002) Century, 
"ESKANDAR, (2009), Randomhouse Bertelsmann

Film

A Flower for the Women in Kabul - 50 years UN (1998), director, (won first human rights film prize)
Alone in Afghanistan - the story of a nurse and her hospital (1997) director
And Hope Remains: the story of a child soldier (1996), director and script 	
Tonino the Camora (1995), director
Shoes - a little psychology (1992), director
Iran - 10 year post Revolution (1989), director
Mahmoudy versus Mahmoody, director
'SAMIRA & SAMIR", 'Gemini''

References 

Iranian women novelists
Iranian novelists
Iranian documentary filmmakers
Iranian women writers
Living people
Women documentary filmmakers
Year of birth missing (living people)